Frank Filo (born December 28, 1971 in Fort Wayne, Indiana) is a retired American soccer defender who spent most of his career with the Dallas Sidekicks.  He also played two seasons in the USISL and part of one season with the Cleveland Crunch in the National Professional Soccer League.

Filo attended Arkansas-Little Rock University. In 1994, he played for the Arkansas A's of the USISL.  In 1995, he played for the Dallas Lightning of the USISL.  On June 22, 1995, he signed with the Dallas Sidekicks of the Continental Indoor Soccer League. He would remain with the Sidekicks until 2004. During his years with Dallas, the team played in the CISL, World Indoor Soccer League, and second Major Indoor Soccer League.  On October 24, 1997, he signed a fifteen-day contract with the Cleveland Crunch in the National Professional Soccer League. The Crunch extended his contract until January 1998 when they released him. He is currently retired from soccer and lives in Murphy, Texas, with his wife, Donna, and two sons.

References

External links
 Dallas Sidekicks player profile

1971 births
Living people
American soccer players
Arkansas A's players
Cleveland Crunch (NPSL) players
Dallas Lightning players
Dallas Sidekicks (CISL) players
Dallas Sidekicks (WISL) players
Dallas Sidekicks (2001–2008 MISL) players
USISL players
Soccer players from Indiana
Sportspeople from Fort Wayne, Indiana
People from Collin County, Texas
Soccer players from Texas
Sportspeople from the Dallas–Fort Worth metroplex
Association football defenders